Amantis lofaoshanensis is a species of praying mantis native to China.

References

lofaoshanensis
Mantodea of Asia
Insects of China
Insects described in 1937